Another Collection of Home Recordings is the fifth music album by American rock musician Lou Barlow, released as "Lou Barlow And Friends" in 1994 in the United States (CD) and Canada (double 7") by Mint Records.

Track listing

References

1994 albums
Sentridoh albums